Asghar Kardoust Poustinsaraei (born March 21, 1986) is an Iranian professional basketball player. He currently plays for Petrochimi Bandar Imam in the Iranian Super League as well as for the Iranian national basketball team, as a Center. He participated in his first major international competition for the Iranian team at the 2010 FIBA World Championship in Turkey.

Honours

National team
Asian Championship
Gold medal: 2013
Bronze medal: 2015
Asian Games
Bronze medal: 2010
Asian Under-18 Championship
Gold medal: 2004

Club
Asian Championship
Gold medal: 2007, 2008 (Saba Battery)
West Asian Championship
Gold medal: 2007 (Saba Battery)
Iranian Basketball Super League
Champions: 2006, 2007 (Saba Battery)

External links
 Profile
Profile

Iranian men's basketball players
1986 births
Living people
Asian Games silver medalists for Iran
Asian Games bronze medalists for Iran
Asian Games medalists in basketball
Basketball players at the 2010 Asian Games
Basketball players at the 2014 Asian Games
Centers (basketball)
Foolad Mahan Isfahan BC players
Medalists at the 2010 Asian Games
Medalists at the 2014 Asian Games
People from Rasht
Petrochimi Bandar Imam BC players
2010 FIBA World Championship players
2014 FIBA Basketball World Cup players
Iranian expatriate basketball people in Lebanon
Sportspeople from Gilan province